Manggar is a subdistrict in the East Balikpapan, Balikpapan.

Tourisms
 Alpha Hill (Bukit Alpha)
 Batakan Beach (Pantai Batakan)

References

External links
 Manggar subdistrict official website (in Indonesia)

Balikpapan